Holywell is a coastal village in north Cornwall, England, United Kingdom. It is at Holywell Bay, about three miles (5 km) west-southwest of Newquay.

Holywell beach adjoins the settlement to the northwest and Penhale Camp, formally an army training establishment that was regularly used by cadets, is half-a-mile to the southwest. On the north side of Holywell beach Holywell Cave is accessible at low tide and contains many pools formed by natural buildup of minerals. In the cave is St Cubert's holy well.

On the east of the beach, there is a 5,000 year old sand dune system that is one of the largest in Britain. During the summer, tourists can use these dunes for Sandboarding.

There are two holiday parks just outside of the village. Holywell Bay Holiday Park, operated by Parkdean Resorts, and Trevornick campsite. It is in the civil parish of Cubert.

W. J. Burley, the author of the Wycliffe novels, lived in Holywell until his death in 2002.

Holywell bay is also the residence of both Maia Garner and Louis Garner, athletes that have represented Great Britain in Surf Lifesaving Sport.

Film location
The "skeet surfing" scene in the 1984 comedy Top Secret! was filmed on Holywell Bay, which stood in for California.

The opening scene for Die Another Day attempting to replicate North Korea, was filmed here in 2002.

Many of the scenes in Poldark were filmed on the beach.

Scenes from the 2015 BBC Miniseries Agatha Christie's And Then There Were None were filmed at Holywell.

References

External links

Beaches of Cornwall
Villages in Cornwall
Surfing locations in Cornwall
Populated coastal places in Cornwall
Holy wells in Cornwall